Project 131 may refer to:
 An episode of the Canadian television show You Can't Do That on Television
 Underground Project 131, an underground military command headquarters site in Hubei, China.
 An East German class of Torpedo boats, also known as the Libelle-class